The 1983 NAIA World Series was a double-elimination tournament to determine the baseball champion of the National Association of Intercollegiate Athletics (NAIA). The tournament was held at Chaparral Stadium on the campus of Lubbock Christian College in Lubbock, Texas from May 30 through June 6. The Lubbock Christian Chaparrals won the tournament, the team's first NAIA baseball championship.

Participants

Tournament

Bracket
To be added

Game results

Notes

References

External links
Official website

NAIA World Series
Baseball in Lubbock, Texas
NAIA World Series
NAIA World Series
NAIA World Series
NAIA World Series
Events in Lubbock, Texas
Sports competitions in Texas